Artolf, also Aistulf, Arnolphus or Atolf (died 1252) was a Hungarian prelate in the first half of the 13th century, who served as Bishop of Transylvania from 1244 to 1245, then Bishop of Győr from 1245 until his death.

Biography

Artolf (or Artolph) was born into an unidentified wealthy Hungarian noble family, which possessed large-scale landholdings in Transdanubia. The Schematizmus dioecesis Jauriensis refers to him as Artolf and Aistulf, simultaneously, while other documents also mention the name variants of Arnolphus and Atolf. Artolf was an educated prelate and skilled in theology and science. He was styled as provost of Vác in 1237.

Artolf was appointed Bishop of Transylvania around June 1244 by Béla IV of Hungary, who filled the dignity after a three-year period vacancy, which lasted from the death of Raynald of Belleville, who was killed in the Battle of Mohi on 11 April 1241. During their invasion, the Mongols completely devastated and perished the province of Transylvania, along with its diocese and church property (including the cathedral). Artolf's task was to begin the restoration of the diocese's administrative and financial positions, but the lack of local knowledge and the shocking experience of the destruction exceeded his suitability.

Around September 1245, the cathedral chapter of Győr elected Artolf as their bishop. Leaving the remote and war-torn Transylvania, he pleased to occupy the position, as the several lands of his family laid in the territory of the diocese. King Béla IV interceded Pope Innocent IV in order to transfer Artolf from Transylvania to Győr. The monarch called his protege as "popular, clean-lived, educated and principled", while argued, "the army of his powerful and influential kinship will be useful for the Crown against the hostile raids at the western boundaries of the kingdom". The remark obviously referred to the emerging tension between Béla IV and Frederick the Quarrelsome, Duke of Austria. The pope contributed to the change and translated Artolf to the Diocese of Győr on 12 December 1245. Artolf's bishopric became a buffer zone between the Kingdom of Hungary and the Duchy of Austria in the upcoming years. He was responsible for to protect the frontier in Western Hungary. It is presumable that Artolf built the tower of the episcopal castle of Győr. Artolf was last mentioned as a living person by contemporary records in November 1251. He died in 1252.

References

Sources

 
 
 
 
 

|-

1252 deaths
13th-century Hungarian Roman Catholic priests
13th-century Roman Catholic bishops in Hungary
Bishops of Győr
Bishops of Transylvania